Krobo Odumase is a town and capital of Lower Manya Krobo Municipal District in the Eastern Region of Ghana. The Presbyterian Boys' Senior High School was formerly located here.

Prominent sites
The town is a proposed site for the construction of University of Environment, Science, Technology and Innovation.

History
The Basel Mission ran a school in Odumase Krobo by 1857. The town became Manya Krobo's capital when Emmanuel Mate Kole became Konor in 1892.

Economy
The town, famous for its glass beadmaking, hosted the First Ghana International Beads Festival in August 2009. The town has its bead markets every Wednesday and Saturday.

Culture
At the end of September the town hosts the seven-day Ngmayem festival.

Notable people
Thomas Partey (born 1993), association football player for Arsenal

References

Populated places in the Eastern Region (Ghana)